Edgar Budischowsky is a West German firearm designer, whose designs were produced by Korriphilia in Germany, and Norton Armament in the United States.

Among his creations were the TP-70 double-action pocket pistol in .22 and .25 calibre, based on an amalgamation of Colt and Walther designs. It was later produced by Norton of Mount Clemens, Michigan, as the TP-22, or "Budischowsky" from 1973-1977; the Michigan models were of better quality than later models made in Floria and Utah.

His most prominent design was the delayed blowback HSP-701, which was produced in Heidelberg at high prices, made to measure, and very low volumes of around 30 pistols produced per year.

References

External links
 Semi-rigid lock for small firearm breech block - has sliding wedge in breech block rear locked by roller DE 2822914 A1. Patent published 1979

Firearm designers
Year of birth missing (living people)
Living people